Dreamwalker may refer to:
Oneironaut, a traveler in a dream
Dreamwalker, a 2000 book by Isobelle Carmody
The Wheel of Time, a novel series featuring "Dreamers" and "Dreamwalkers" in its setting
Alundra and Meia, fictional characters referred to as "Dreamwalkers" in the video game Alundra
"Dreamwalkers", a song by Erra from their 2013 album Augment

See also
The Dreamwalker's Child, a 2005 novel by Steve Voake
Dream Walker (disambiguation)